Charlotte Hayes (born 1977) is a British actress known for her TV, film and audio work. She is the daughter of Wendy Padbury and Melvyn Hayes.

She has appeared in several Doctor Who audio dramas, including Master (2003) and Annihilation (2011). In one of them, the 2008 audio adaptation of the stage play Seven Keys to Doomsday, she played Jenny, the part originally played by her mother, whilst she also appeared  alongside her mother in The Memory Cheats (2011), The Uncertainty Principle (2012), and Lords of the Red Planet (2013).

She has also appeared as the recurring characters Ruth Wycliffe in Wycliffe (1996-1998) and Kate in Crossroads (2003). Other notable appearances include Looking for Victoria (2003) and Jack and the Cuckoo-Clock Heart (2013).

References

1977 births
20th-century British actresses
Living people
Place of birth missing (living people)
21st-century British actresses
British film actresses
British television actresses
British voice actresses
Date of birth missing (living people)